FilmNation Entertainment, LLC is an American film production, co-financing and international sales company, founded by film executive Glen Basner in 2008.

History

2008–2012: Founding 
FilmNation Entertainment is an independent film production and distribution company founded in 2008 by Glen Basner with funding from real estate developer Steven Samuels. Initially, the company was a foreign sales firm, selling distribution right in various international markets.

2012–2018: Early growth 
In 2012, FilmNation produced its first film, Mud, which competed at the Cannes Film Festival.  On November 6, 2013, FilmNation Entertainment became part of the American Film Market for the first time. In December 2014, Village Roadshow invested $18 million for 33% stake in the company to make film production a regular part of operations. With growing success, the Los Angeles Times labeled FilmNation as “the emerging Oscar powerhouse you’ve never heard of.”

2018–present: Expansion 
In April 2018, FilmNation agreed to a $120 million revolving multi-bank credit facility with Bank of America Merrill Lynch and co-led by MUFG Union Bank. The funds would be used to give films larger budgets, take on additional films and enter the TV film, theater, digital and VR content markets plus other strategic investment areas.

In early 2019, FilmNation and Nordic Entertainment Group formed a television joint venture based in the United Kingdom that will operate under the FilmNation name. Nordic Entertainment Group will have first option on exclusive distribution rights to all of the joint venture’s productions in the Nordic countries. FilmNation hired TV vet Kirstie Macdonaldto to spearhead the London division.

Filmography

Upcoming
Misanthrope
Fingernails
Foe
Conclave

Filmography by year

2023
You Hurt My Feelings (2023)
Knock at the Cabin (2023)
Down Low (2023)
The Young Wife (2023)

2022
The 355 (2022)
Sharp Stick (2022)
The Outfit (2022)
Dog (2022)
Operation Mincemeat (2022)
Three Thousand Years of Longing (2022)
The Good Nurse (2022)
The People We Hate at the Wedding (2022)
Emancipation (2022)
The Good House (2022)

2021

The Map of Tiny Perfect Things (2021)
Reminiscence (2021)
Red Rocket (2021)
Spencer (2021)

2020

The Courier (2020)
Palm Springs (2020)
Greyhound (2020)
The Nest (2020)
The Glorias (2020)
Bad Hair (2020)
Promising Young Woman (2020)
The Human Voice (2020)
The Personal History of David Copperfield (2020)

2019
Pain and Glory (2019)
Late Night (2019)
The Lodge (2019)
The Day Shall Come (2019)
47 Meters Down: Uncaged (2019)
Lucky Day (2019)
7500 (2019)
The Irishman (2019)
The Aeronauts (2019)

2018
City of Lies (2018)
Gloria Bell (2018)
The Nightingale (2018)
Beautiful Boy (2018)
The Catcher Was a Spy (2018)
Life Itself (2018)
Don't Worry, He Won't Get Far on Foot (2018)
Suspiria (2018)
Wildlife (2018)

2017
The Big Sick (2017)
Beatriz at Dinner (2017)
The Children Act (2017)
Disobedience (2017)
Gifted (2017)
Kill Switch (2017)
Last Flag Flying (2017)
Logan Lucky (2017)
The Man with the Iron Heart (2017)
The Only Living Boy in New York (2017)
The Sense of an Ending (2017)
Sleepless (2017)
The Wall (2017)
Song to Song (2017)
Wonderstruck (2017)
Wonder Wheel (2017)

2016
Arrival (2016)
The Promise (2016)
The Founder (2016)
Genius (2016)
Café Society (2016)
Indignation (2016)
Julieta (2016)
Midnight Special (2016)
Miss Sloane (2016)
Sing Street (2016)
Sully (2016)
The Whole Truth (2016)
Zero Days (2016)

2015
American Ultra (2015)
Knight of Cups (2015)
Life (2015)
Mr. Holmes (2015)
Room (2015)
Solace (2015)
Regression (2015)
Self/less (2015)
Tracers (2015)
Truth (2015)

2014
Clown (2014)
The Imitation Game (2014)
Magic in the Moonlight (2014)
A Most Violent Year (2014)
A Most Wanted Man (2014)
Premature (2014)
The Rover (2014)
The Rewrite (2014)
Top Five (2014)
While We're Young (2014)

2013
21 & Over (2013)
All Is Lost (2013)
Blue Jasmine (2013)
Crush (2013)
The Bling Ring (2013)
I'm So Excited! (2013)
Nebraska (2013)
Side Effects (2013)
Safe Haven (2013)
Under the Skin (2013)

2012
Act of Valor (2012)
Gambit (2012)
House at the End of the Street (2012)
Aftershock (2012)
Chernobyl Diaries (2012)
Lawless (2012)
Lola Versus (2012)
Looper (2012) 
Magic Mike (2012)
Midnight's Children (2012)
Mirror Mirror (2012)
Mud (2012)
The Raven (2012)
Red Dawn (2012)
To the Wonder (2012)
To Rome with Love (2012)

2011
The Oranges (2011)
The Flowers of War (2011)
Sanctum (2011)
Seeking Justice (2011)
The Skin I Live In (2011)
Take Shelter (2011)

2010
Ceremony (2010)
Frozen (2010)
I Love You Too (2010)
The King's Speech (2010)
The Ward (2010)

2009
The Joneses (2009)
The Road (2009)

References

External links

2008 establishments in New York City
American companies established in 2008
American independent film studios
Entertainment companies based in New York City
Entertainment companies established in 2008
Film production companies of the United States
International sales agents